The 2012 St Albans City and District Council election took place on 3 May 2012 to elect members of St Albans District Council in Hertfordshire, England. One third of the council was up for election and the council stayed under no overall control.

After the election, the composition of the council was:
Conservative 29
Liberal Democrats 19
Labour 8
Green 1
Independent 1

Background
Before the election the Conservatives were the largest party on the council with 29 of the 58 seats. The Liberal Democrats had 23 seats, Labour had 4 seats, the Green Party had 1 seat and there was 1 Independent. Since the last election in 2011 Labour had gained a seat in Batchwood from the Liberal Democrats at a by-election in January 2012.

19 seats were contested in 2012 with both the Conservative and Labour parties having a full 19 candidates, the Liberal Democrats had 18 and the Greens had 17. There were 3 independent candidates as well, the sitting independent councillor Tony Swendell in Redbourn, the former Labour group leader Maurice MacMillan in London Colney, who had left the party a few years before over the imposition of an all-women shortlist, and Conservative councillor John Chambers, who was standing in Harpenden North as an independent after having been deselected by the Conservatives. Of the 19 seats the Conservatives were defending 9, the Liberal Democrats 8 and both the Green party and an independent were defending 1 seat.

Election result
The Labour Party gained 4 seats to have 8 councillors after taking 3 seats from the Liberal Democrats and 1 seat from the Conservatives. The Conservatives remained the largest party, while the Liberal Democrats dropped to 19 seats and both the Green Party and Independent Tony Swendell held the seats they had been defending.

Ward results

References

2012 English local elections
2012
2010s in Hertfordshire